Hamoon Derafshipour (born September 22, 1992 in Kermanshah, Iran) is an Iranian karateka. He qualified for the 2020 Summer Olympics in Tokyo, Japan, where karate will be featured for the first time, as part of the International Olympic Committee (IOC) Refugee Olympic Team, He started practicing karate when he was 7 years old. Previously, Derafshipour won a bronze medal in the Men’s Individual -67 Kg Kumite at the 2018 Senior World Karate Championships at Madrid, Spain and Two Asian Karate Championships titles, and several other medals, including three golds and three bronze in the World Karate Federation Karate1 Premier League Championship.

Hamoon is currently living in Canada with his wife after leaving his country Iran for personal and security reasons.

References

External links 

 

Living people
Iranian male karateka
Islamic Solidarity Games competitors for Iran
Islamic Solidarity Games medalists in karate
Karateka at the 2020 Summer Olympics
1992 births
Refugee Olympic Team at the 2020 Summer Olympics
20th-century Iranian people
21st-century Iranian people